Hasan Karacadağ (born 20 October 1976) is a Turkish film director. He has directed more than twelve films since 1999. He was the director that introduced jinn into Turkish cinema. His Dabbe film series has gone on to become a cult classic due to its distribution on Netflix.

Selected filmography

References

External links 

1976 births
Living people
Turkish film directors